Two in the Dark is a 1936 American mystery film directed by Benjamin Stoloff and starring Walter Abel, Margot Grahame, Wallace Ford, Gail Patrick, and Alan Hale. The screenplay concerns an amnesiac suspected of murder.

In 1945, Stoloff produced a remake, Two O'Clock Courage, directed by Anthony Mann and starring Tom Conway and Ann Rutherford.

Plot summary
Wandering around in the darkness, an amnesiac (Walter Abel) has the feeling that he's murdered someone. He reads that a theatrical producer has been killed and he thinks that he's guilty. However, unemployed actress Marie Smith (Margot Grahame), whom he meets while wandering around the park, isn't convinced, so she helps him reconstruct the clues and find the killer.

Cast
 Walter Abel as Ford Adams  
 Margot Grahame as Marie Smith  
 Wallace Ford as Harry Hillyer  
 Gail Patrick as Irene Lassiter  
 Alan Hale as Police Inspector Florio  
 Leslie Fenton as Stuart Eldredge  
 Eric Blore as Edmund Fish  
 Erin O'Brien-Moore as Olga Konar  
 Erik Rhodes as Carlo Gheet  
 J. Carrol Naish as Burt Mansfield  
 Addison Randall as Duke Reed  
 Ward Bond as Policeman in Park

References

External links
 
 
 

1936 films
American mystery drama films
American black-and-white films
Films about amnesia
Films directed by Benjamin Stoloff
1930s mystery drama films
1936 drama films
RKO Pictures films
Films based on American novels
1930s English-language films
1930s American films